The Dragon Knight is a fantasy novel by American writer Gordon R. Dickson, the second in his Dragon Knight series.  The novel begins five months after the battle at Loathly Tower, which took place in The Dragon and the George.

Plot
Jim and Angie are adjusting to their new lives within this parallel dimension of 14th-century medieval England, or as well as any 20th-century persons might. Jim, who is now the Sir James, Baron of Malencontri et Riveroak is trying to be a good English Lord. However, fate conspires against him and must set him on an adventure to recover the prince of England, who is being held captive in France. Little does Jim know that he'll be going up against the interests of the "Dark Powers" who are already at work to thwart Jim's mission. This will culminate in Jim squaring off against the evil and powerful sorcerer Malvinne.

Film
In June 2013, Seattle film director Jesse Stipek acquired the motion picture rights to produce a live-action adaptation of The Flight of Dragons, loosely based on characters and locations within the novel.

Sources

External links

1990 American novels
1990 fantasy novels
Novels by Gordon R. Dickson
Tor Books books
Novels set in the 14th century